Randeh Shahraki (also Romanized as Randeh Shahrakī; also known as Randeh and Randeh-ye Soflá) is a village in Margan Rural District, in the Central District of Hirmand County, Sistan and Baluchestan Province, Iran. At the 2006 census, its population was 478, in 93 families.

References 

Populated places in Hirmand County